Nina Witoszek Nina Witoszek (Fitzpatrick) is a Polish-Irish-Norwegian writer and research professor at the Center for Development and the Environment in Oslo. She is also director of the Arne Næss Programme on Global Justice and the Environment (SUM) at the University of Oslo. Prior to her work at SUM, she taught comparative cultural history at the National University of Ireland in Galway (1995-1997) and the European University in Florence (1997-1999). She held fellowships at the Swedish Collegium of the Advanced Studies in the Social Sciences in Uppsala (1993), Robinson College, Cambridge (1995) and Mansfield College, Oxford (2001) and visiting professorship at Stanford University (2010).

Nina Witoszek is also a fiction writer (under the pen name Nina FitzPatrick). She is best known for the infamous collection of short stories, Fables of the Irish Intelligentsia (1991), which won the Irish Times-Aer Lingus Award for fiction in 1991. The prize was subsequently withdrawn when she couldn't prove her Irish ancestry. Until 2001 her fictional work – including The Loves of Faustyna (1995) and Daimons (2003), as well as several well film scripts – was written together with her late husband Pat Sheeran. She is also a script writer of a series of documentary films about iconic Norwegian thinkers and exploreres, such as Fridtjof Nansen, Arne Næss, and Thor Heyerdahl.
Witoszek is the recipient of the Norwegian Freedom of Expression Foundation (Fritt Ord) Award for “bringing Eastern European perspectives to the public debate in Scandinavia.” In 2006 she was chosen by the Norwegian daily Dagbladet as “one of the 10 most important intellectuals in Norway.”

Selection of scholarly books 
Witoszek, N. and Mercelova, M., (2022, forthcoming) The Scandinavian Ecosphere, Palgrave Macmillan. 
Witoszek, N. Korzenie antyautorytaryzmu. Warszawa: Scholar
Witoszek, N. (2019) The Origins of Antiauthoritarianism. London: Routledge.  
Witoszek, N, and Midttun , A (ed). Sustainable Modernity: The Nordic Model and Beyond. London: Routledge.
Trägårdh, L. and N. Witoszek (eds), Civil Society in the Age of Monitory Democracy, Oxford: Berghahn, 2013.
Witoszek, N. (2011) The Origins of the Regime of Goodness. Remapping the Norwegian Cultural History. Oslo: Universitetsforlaget.
Witoszek, N. (2009) Nina Verdens beste land /The Best country in the world, Oslo: Aschehoug, 2009.
Witoszek, N. and Trägårdh, L., Culture and Crisis: the Case of Germany and Scandinavia, New York, Oxford: Berghahn Books Inc., 2002.
Witoszek, N. and Bo Stråth, The Postmodern Challenge: East and West Perspectives, Amsterdam/Atlanta: Rodopi, 1999.
Witoszek, N. and A. Brennan, Philosophical Dialogues: Arne Næss and the Progress of Deep Ecology, Boston: Rowman and Littlefield 1999.
Witoszek, N. (1998) Norske naturmytologier (The Norwegian Nature Mythologies) Oslo: Pax. 
Witoszek, N.  and  P. Sheeran (1992) Talking to the Dead: The Irish  Funerary Traditions.  Atlanta: Rodopi 1997.

Selected works of fiction 

Fables of the Irish Intelligentsia (1991) New York: Penguin Books 1993. Winner of The Irish Times/ Air Lingus Fiction Award.
The Loves of Faustyna, New York: Penguin Books, 1995
Daimons, Boston: Justin Charles, 2003.
Operation Opera, opera libretto. Norwegian Premiere at Den Norske Opera, 2011.
Tesla's Curse, Oslo: Malina Press, 2021

References

External links 
 Official website

Cultural historians
Academic staff of the University of Oslo
1954 births
Living people
Polish emigrants to Norway
Norwegian novelists